Lindsay Marie Felton (born December 4, 1984) is an American actress. She is best known for her roles as Caitlin Seeger in Caitlin's Way and Anna Morgan in Anna's Dream.

Life and career
Felton was born in Seattle, Washington.  She had a variety of roles since beginning acting in advertisements on local television at age three. 

Her first major network television appearance came in 1994 on the short-lived ABC sitcom Thunder Alley, as the granddaughter of Edward Asner's character. She made her feature film debut in 1998 in 3 Ninjas: High Noon at Mega Mountain. 

In 2000, Felton got her first starring role, as Caitlin Seeger on the Nickelodeon series "Caitlin's Way", which ran for 52 episodes. 

Felton then moved on to several leading roles in independent movies released on TV or video, including the short film Size 'Em Up, PAX-TV's movie Anna's Dream, and the direct-to-video release The Metro Chase. In 2003 she appeared in the feature film Grind as Denise Jenson. In 2006, she appeared in ER episode 273, "Heart of the Matter", as Donna Palsey.  She appeared in the independent film Two Star State of Mind in 2008.  Felton appeared on the VH1 reality show Scream Queens.  The show premiered on October 20, 2008, and Felton was eliminated in the final episode, finishing in third place.

Filmography

Film

Television

Awards and nominations

References

External links
 Lindsay Felton on Twitter
 Lindsay Felton on Instagram
 

1984 births
20th-century American actresses
21st-century American actresses
American child actresses
American film actresses
American television actresses
Living people
Participants in American reality television series
Actresses from Seattle